Tzvika Hadar may refer to:
 Zvika Hadar, Israeli actor, comedian and television host
 Tzvika Hadar (bowls)